Elisabet "Lisa" Lindgren (born 3 June 1968 in Råsunda, Solna, Stockholm County) is a Swedish actress.

Filmography
Tillsammans (2000)
Hans och hennes (2001)
Klassfesten (2002)
Skenäktenskap (2002)
 2002 – Tusenbröder (TV series)
Lejontämjaren (2003)
Hjärtslag (2004)
 2004 – Populärmusik från Vittula
Made in Yugoslavia (2005)
Percy, Buffalo Bill & jag (2005)

References

External links
 

1968 births
Living people
Swedish actresses